Víctor Montiglio Rezzio (21 January 1944−30 March 2011) is a Chilean lawyer who served as president of the Supreme Court of Chile.

References

1944 births
2011 deaths
20th-century Chilean judges
Living people
21st-century Chilean judges
Pontifical Catholic University of Valparaíso alumni
Supreme Court of Chile members